Northstar Travel Group is a publications and event management company focused on the travel industry. The company's brands include Business Travel News, Travel Procurement, The Beat, Travel Weekly, Travel Pulse, TravelAge West, Travel Weekly China, Successful Meetings, Meetings & Conventions, Incentive, M&C China, Travel42, Axus Travel App, and Web in Travel. It also owns Phocuswright, a research, business intelligence, and event producer serving the travel technology industry, and its publication, Phocuswire. The company produces more than 80 events in 13 countries related to the travel industry, including the Phocuswright Conference, ALIS (the largest hotel investment conference in the world; produced with the American Hotel and Lodging Association annually in Los Angeles), The Business Travel Show, The Meetings Show, Web in Travel, CruiseWorld, Global Travel Marketplace, and TEAMS. It owns a majority of Inntopia.

Print media accounts for 18% of total revenue, events accounts for 39.2% of revenue, and digital revenue accounts for 42.7% of revenue.

History
In 1989, Reed International (now RELX) acquired Travel Weekly, Meetings & Conventions and the hotel databases from Murdoch Magazines and formed Reed Travel Group.

In 1998, Reed Travel Group was renamed Cahners Travel Group.

In 2001, Boston Ventures acquired Cahners Travel Group and renamed it Northstar Travel Group.

In 2012, Boston Ventures Investment Partners sold the company to Wicks Group.

In 2016, the company was acquired by Wasserstein & Co.

In October 2019, the company acquired travAlliancemedia, owner of  TravelPulse.com and TravelPulse Canada, Buying Business Travel, covering the corporate travel market, and CAT Media, which serves the meetings and incentives industries.

References

External links
 

Companies based in Hudson County, New Jersey
Privately held companies based in New Jersey
Secaucus, New Jersey
Mass media companies of the United States